The Chekka massacre occurred on July 5, 1976, when Palestinian and Lebanese National Movement fighters killed roughly 200 people in the Christian towns of Chekka and Hamat during the Lebanese Civil War. The massacre was in retaliation for the Tel al-Zaatar massacre in which Lebanese Maronite militias killed thousands of Palestinian refugees in Beirut.

The attack was launched from Tripoli by Palestinian militants and members of an Islamist group called Jund Allah. The group stormed the Christian pro-Syrian Social Nationalist Party settlement of Chekka as well as Hamat. An estimated 200 people were killed in the ensuing 24 hours. Palestinians and LNM fighters destroyed and looted houses as they stabbed residents to death with knives and bayonets. Residents tried to flee through a tunnel to Batroun but the attackers blocked the exit. Many were killed as their cars caught fire, and they suffocated to death.

Around 200 civilians were killed. 4,200 people were living in the town at the time, meaning that approximately over 4% of Chekka's population at the time. Chekka and Hamat were later recaptured by right-wing Christian paramilitaries, as well as several other towns that had been taken during the LNM's offensive.

See also
 Damour massacre
 Aishiyeh massacre
 Black Thursday (Lebanon)
 Qaa massacre

References

1976 in Christianity
Massacres of Christians in Lebanon
Massacres in 1976
Massacres of the Lebanese Civil War
July 1976 events in Asia
Persecution of Christians by Muslims
Anti-Christian sentiment in Asia
1976 murders in Lebanon
Batroun District
Massacres committed by the Palestine Liberation Organization